Maribeth Monroe (born March 25, 1978) is an American actress, writer and comedian. She is known for portraying Alice Murphy on Comedy Central's sitcom Workaholics, Mindy St. Claire on NBC's sitcom The Good Place, and Christina Wheeler on CBS' sitcom Bob Hearts Abishola. 

She has also appeared in the films The Back-up Plan (2010), Keeping Up with the Joneses (2016), Downsizing (2017), and Jumanji: Welcome to the Jungle (2017).

Career
Monroe performed at The Second City, both on the Chicago and Detroit stages. In Chicago, she appeared in the 2004 revue Red Scare, directed by Mick Napier, where the character "Sassy Gay Friend" originated, and she would later appear as Desdemona in one of the character's online incarnations.

She has appeared in episodes of The Neighbors, Parks and Recreation, The Big Bang Theory, The Brink, According to Jim, Hannah Montana, Maron, Modern Family, Key & Peele and the web series Cowgirl Up. In 2010, she appeared in the romantic comedy film The Back-up Plan. In fall 2012, she appeared in Applebee's commercials with ESPN host Chris Berman. In 2014, Monroe began appearing in commercials for La Quinta Inns & Suites and E-Trade, with Kevin Spacey.

From 2017 to 2020, Monroe had a recurring role as Mindy St. Claire on the NBC sitcom The Good Place and in 2019 began appearing as Christina Wheeler on the CBS sitcom Bob Hearts Abishola.

Filmography

References

External links
 

1978 births
20th-century American actresses
21st-century American actresses
Actresses from Michigan
American television actresses
American women comedians
Living people
People from Fraser, Michigan
20th-century American comedians
21st-century American comedians
Comedians from Michigan